Yilan is a town in and the seat of Yilan County in south-central Heilongjiang province, China, located where the Woken and Mudan Rivers flow separately into the Songhua River. It is serviced by G1011 Harbin–Tongjiang Expressway and China National Highway 221.

References 

Township-level divisions of Heilongjiang